Kohtla-Järve JK Alko was an Estonian football club based in the town of Kohtla-Järve, in 2012 the club merged with city rivals Kohtla-Järve FC Lootus to form Kohtla-Järve JK Järve.

References

External links
Team page at Estonian Football Association

1996 establishments in Estonia
Sport in Kohtla-Järve
Defunct football clubs in Estonia
2012 disestablishments in Estonia
Association football clubs established in 1996
Association football clubs disestablished in 2012